Najas marina is a species of aquatic plant known by the common names spiny water nymph, spiny naiad and holly-leaved naiad.  It is an extremely widespread species, reported across Europe, Asia, Africa, Australia, the Americas and many oceanic islands. It can be found in many types of freshwater and brackish aquatic habitat, including bodies of alkaline water.

Description
Najas marina is an annual producing a slender, branching stem up to 40 or 45 centimeters in maximum length. The evenly spaced leaves are up to 4 centimeters long, 1 to 3 millimeters wide, and edged in tiny sawlike teeth. The leaf has prickles along its midvein. Minute stalkless, green flowers occur in the leaf axils. The plant is dioecious, with male and female flower types occurring on separate individuals. In the British Isles it is possible that only female plants occur. It flowers in mid-summer.

Varieties and subspecies

A long list of varietal and subspecific names have been proposed over the years. At present, only nine are widely accepted:

Najas marina subsp. arsenariensis (Maire) L.Triest - Algeria
Najas marina var. brachycarpa Trautv. - China and Kazakhstan
Najas marina subsp. commersonii L.Triest - Madagascar, Mauritius, Réunion
Najas marina var. grossidentata Rendle - Korea and Manchuria
Najas marina var. intermedia (Wolfg. ex Gorski) Rendle - Spain, Sicily, Africa, the Middle East, China, Sri Lanka
Najas marina var. marina 
Najas marina subsp. marina 
Najas marina subsp. sumatrana (W.J.de Wilde) L.Triest - Sumatra
Najas marina var. zollingeri Rendle - Bali

Distribution and habitat
Najas marina has a wide, almost circumglobal distribution in temperate and tropical regions. It occurs in mesoeutrophic water over deep peat or mud. It was first recorded in the British Isles in 1883 at Hickling Broad in Norfolk where it had become established. Populations declined in the 1960s because of pollution, but action has been taken to reduce the level of nutrients in the Norfolk Broads and the water quality has improved.

Fossil record
One  fossil seed of Najas marina has been extracted from borehole samples of the Middle Miocene fresh water deposits in Nowy Sacz Basin, West Carpathians, Poland.

References

External links
Jepson Manual Treatment
Photo gallery

marina
Aquatic plants
Plants described in 1753
Taxa named by Carl Linnaeus
Flora of North America
Flora of South America
Flora of Africa
Flora of temperate Asia
Flora of tropical Asia
Flora of Europe
Flora of Australia
Dioecious plants